The Central District of Ben County is in Chaharmahal and Bakhtiari province, Iran. At the 2006 census, its population was 27,731 in 7,056 households, when it was the former Ben District in Shahrekord County. The following census in 2011 counted 29,481 people in 8,509 households. At the latest census in 2016, the district had 23,624 inhabitants living in 7,328 households, by which time the Central District and Sheyda District had formed in the newly established Ben County.

References 

Ben County

Districts of Chaharmahal and Bakhtiari Province

Populated places in Chaharmahal and Bakhtiari Province

Populated places in Ben County

fa:بخش مرکزی شهرستان بن